I Do Not Come To You By Chance is a 2009 novel by Nigeria writer Adaobi Tricia Nwaubani. It is her debut novel which was published on May 1, 2009, by Hachette Books, an imprint of Perseus Books Group.

Plot summary
I Do Not Come To You By Chance centers mainly on Kinglsey Ibe, the protagonist of the novel who after graduating from the university found out it isn't an easy feat getting a paying job in Nigeria. He visits Cash Daddy, his uncle, to learn email scamming.

Reception
 2010 Commonwealth Writers Prize for Best First Book (Africa).
 2010 Betty Trask First Book Award.
 2010 Wole Soyinka Prize for Literature in Africa finalist.
 2012 Nigeria Prize for Literature shortlist.
 The Washington Post Best Books 2009.

References 

2009 Nigerian novels
2009 debut novels
Hachette Books books
Nigerian satirical novels